Longhua Subdistrict is a subdistrict in Longhua District, Shenzhen, Guangdong Province, China. Before 30 December 2011, it was part of Bao'an District.

Industry
Foxconn Technology Group, the world's largest electronics contract manufacturer has its largest factory precinct at Longhua Science and Technology Park in Longhua, employing hundreds of thousands of workers in 15 factories.

Huawei's headquarter campus is also located in Longhua, adjacent to Foxconn's campus.

Transportation
The area is served by Line 4 of Shenzhen Metro.

External links
 

Longhua District, Shenzhen
Subdistricts of Shenzhen